Georgios Strezos (born 6 July 1995) is a Greek professional footballer who plays as a goalkeeper for Super League 2 club Kallithea.

Career
On 5 June 2019, Strezos solved his contract with OFI, and on 25 September 2019, signed with Eredivisie club Willem II for a year (with an option for an additional year) for an undisclosed fee.

Honours
Olympiacos
Super League: 2014–15

OFI
Football League: 2017–18

References

1995 births
Living people
Greek footballers
Greek expatriate footballers
Greece youth international footballers
Association football goalkeepers
Super League Greece players
Olympiacos F.C. players
Panegialios F.C. players
Panachaiki F.C. players
OFI Crete F.C. players
Kallithea F.C. players
People from Thessaloniki (regional unit)
Footballers from Central Macedonia